Evalyn Knapp (born Evelyn Pauline Knapp; June 17, 1906 – June 12, 1981) was an American film actress of the late 1920s, 1930s and into the 1940s. She was a leading B-movie serial actress in the 1930s. She was the younger sister of the orchestra leader Orville Knapp.

Life and career
Knapp started acting in silent films, her first role being in the 1929 film At the Dentist's. She was cast as leading lady in Smart Money in 1931, the only film starring both Edward G. Robinson and James Cagney. In 1932, Knapp was one of 14 girls, along with Ginger Rogers and Gloria Stuart, selected as WAMPAS Baby Stars.

She achieved success in cliffhanger serials, which were popular at the time. She played the title character in the 1933 serial The Perils of Pauline. The same year, she starred, with top billing, alongside 26-year-old John Wayne in His Private Secretary, a light comedy in which Wayne portrays a playboy determined to win her over. She also appeared in Corruption that year opposite Preston Foster. One of her better known film roles was opposite Ken Maynard in the 1934 film In Old Santa Fe featuring Gene Autry in his first screen appearance, in which he sang with a bluegrass band.

She worked through 1941, but her career slowed afterward. In 1943, she played her last role, uncredited, in Two Weeks to Live, one of the Lum and Abner films starring Chester Lauck and Norris Goff.

Personal life
In 1931, Knapp spent several months in the hospital after she fell from a cliff during a hike with her brother, Orville. Two vertebrae were fractured. 

Her brother, orchestra leader Orville Knapp, died in a plane crash while piloting the plane in 1936, smashing into the runway. He was 32 years old. He was married to film actress Gloria Grafton.

She married Dr. George A. Snyder in 1934.

Retirement and death
Following her retirement, she concentrated on her family. She and Snyder remained married until his death in 1977. On June 12, 1981, Knapp died of heart disease at St. Vincent's Hospital in Los Angeles, California, five days before her 75th birthday.

Partial filmography

At the Dentist's (1929)
Sinners' Holiday (1930) – Jennie Delano
River's End (1930) – Miriam McDowell
Mothers Cry (1930) – Jenny Williams
50 Million Frenchmen (1931) – Miss Wheeler-Smith
The Millionaire (1931) – Barbara Alden
Smart Money (1931) – Irene Graham
The Bargain (1931) – Vorencia
Side Show (1931) – Irene
Taxi! (1931) – Actress in Movie Clip (uncredited)
High Pressure (1932) – Helen Wilson
Fireman, Save My Child (1932) – Sally Toby
The Strange Love of Molly Louvain (1932) – Doris
Madame Racketeer (1932) – Alice Hicks
The Vanishing Frontier (1932) – Carol Winfield
The Night Mayor (1932) – Doree Dawn
Big City Blues (1932) – Jo-Jo (uncredited)
 This Sporting Age (1932) – Mickey Steele
A Successful Calamity (1932) – Peggy Wilton
Slightly Married (1932) – Mary Smith
Bachelor Mother (1932) – Mary Somerset
Air Hostess (1933) – Kitty King
State Trooper (1933) – June Brady
His Private Secretary (1933) – Marion Hall
Corruption (1933) – Ellen Manning
Dance Girl Dance (1933) – Sally Patter
 Police Car 17 (1933) – Helen Regan
The Perils of Pauline (1933, Serial) – Pauline Hargrave
Speed Wings (1934) – Mary Stuart
A Man's Game (1934) – Judy Manners
In Old Santa Fe (1934) – Lila Miller
One Frightened Night (1935) – Fake Doris Waverly
Ladies Crave Excitement (1935) – Wilma Howell
Confidential (1935) – Maxine Travers
The Fire Trap (1935) – Betty Marshall
Laughing Irish Eyes (1936) – Peggy Kelly
Three of a Kind (1936) – Barbara Penfield
Bulldog Edition (1936) – Randy Burns
Hawaiian Buckaroo (1938) – Paula Harrington
Rawhide (1938) – Peggy Gehrig
Wanted by the Police (1938) – Kathleen Murphy
Idiot's Delight (1939) – Nurse #4 (uncredited)
Mr. Smith Goes to Washington (1939) – Reporter Asking 'What Do You Think of the Girls in This Town?' (uncredited)
Sauce for the Gander (1940) – Secretary
Girl in 313 (1940) – Arrested Girl
The Lone Wolf Takes a Chance (1941) – Evelyn Jordan
Roar of the Press (1941) – Evelyn
Two Weeks to Live (1943) – Miss Morris, Dr. O'Brien's Secretary (uncredited) (final film role)

References

External links

1906 births
1981 deaths
American people of German descent
Actresses from Kansas City, Missouri
American film actresses
American silent film actresses
20th-century American actresses
WAMPAS Baby Stars